Transatlantic cable may refer to:

 Transatlantic telegraph cable
 Transatlantic communications cable
 Other transatlantic submarine communications cable